Isodrin may refer to either of two chemical compounds:

 Isodrin, an organochlorine insecticide which is an isomer of aldrin 
 Pholedrine (4-HMA), a methylamphetamine derivative